The Uraricoera River (Uraricuera) is a river of Roraima state in northern Brazil. The confluence of the Uraricoera and Takutu Rivers forms the Branco River.

Basin

The river drains the Guayanan Highlands moist forests ecoregion.
Part of the river's basin is in the Roraima National Forest.
The Maracá Ecological Station was established by presidential decree on 2 June 1981.

See also
List of rivers of Roraima

References

Brazilian Ministry of Transport

Rivers of Roraima